These 296 species belong to Campsicnemus, a genus of long-legged flies in the family Dolichopodidae.

Campsicnemus species

 Campsicnemus aa Evenhuis, 2009 g 
 Campsicnemus acuticornis Parent, 1939 i c g 
 Campsicnemus adachiae Evenhuis, 2015 
 Campsicnemus aeptus Hardy & Kohn, 1964 i c g 
 Campsicnemus alaskensis Harmston & Miller, 1966 i c g 
 Campsicnemus albicomus Tenorio, 1969 c g
 Campsicnemus albilabris (Zetterstedt, 1859)
 Campsicnemus albitarsus Hardy & Kohn, 1964 c g
 Campsicnemus alexanderi Harmston & Miller, 1966 i c g 
 Campsicnemus alpinus (Haliday, 1833) c g 
 Campsicnemus amana Evenhuis, 2003 c g 
 Campsicnemus amblytylus Hardy & Kohn, 1964 c g
 Campsicnemus americanus Van Duzee, 1924 i c g
 Campsicnemus amini Olejnicek, 1981 c g
 Campsicnemus aniani Evenhuis, 2012 g 
 Campsicnemus arcuatus Van Duzee, 1917 i c g
 Campsicnemus argyropterus Negrobov & Shamshev, 1985 c g
 Campsicnemus armatus (Zetterstedt, 1849) c g 
 Campsicnemus armeniacus Negrobov, Manko, Hrivniak & Obona, 2017
 Campsicnemus armoricanus Parent, 1926 c g
 Campsicnemus asterisk Evenhuis, 2003 c g 
 Campsicnemus atlanticus Dyte, 1980 c g 
 Campsicnemus aurilobus Tenorio, 1969 c g
 Campsicnemus azyx Evenhuis, 2013 
 Campsicnemus bagachanovae Grichanov & Volfov, 2009
 Campsicnemus barbitibia Stackelberg, 1947 c g
 Campsicnemus bartletti Evenhuis, 2015 
 Campsicnemus bellulus Van Duzee, 1933 i c g 
 Campsicnemus bicirritus Tenorio, 1969 c g
 Campsicnemus bicoloripes Parent, 1937 i c g
 Campsicnemus bicrenatus Hardy & Kohn, 1964 i c g
 Campsicnemus biseta Hardy & Kohn, 1964 i c g
 Campsicnemus borabora Evenhuis, 2008 c g 
 Campsicnemus breviciliatus Parent, 1939 i c g 
 Campsicnemus brevipes Van Duzee, 1933 i c g 
 Campsicnemus brevitibia Hardy & Kohn, 1964 i c g
 Campsicnemus brunnescens Hardy & Kohn, 1964 i c g
 Campsicnemus bryanti Malloch, 1932 i c g
 Campsicnemus bryophilus (Adachi, 1954) c g 
 Campsicnemus caffer Curran, 1926 c g
 Campsicnemus calcaratus Grimshaw, 1901 c g
 Campsicnemus camptoplax Hardy & Kohn, 1964 i c g
 Campsicnemus capellarii Grichanov, 2016 
 Campsicnemus capitulatus Hardy & Kohn, 1964 i c g
 Campsicnemus carinatus Hardy & Kohn, 1964 i c g
 Campsicnemus charliechaplini Evenhuis, 1996 c g 
 Campsicnemus chauliopodus Hardy & Kohn, 1964 i c g
 Campsicnemus cheesmanae Evenhuis, 2009 g 
 Campsicnemus ciliatoides Evenhuis, 2012 
 Campsicnemus ciliatus Van Duzee, 1933 i c g 
 Campsicnemus cinctipus Harmston, 1968 i c g
 Campsicnemus claudicans Loew, 1864 i c g
 Campsicnemus clinotibia Hardy & Kohn, 1964 i c g
 Campsicnemus coloradensis (Harmston & Miller, 1966) i c g 
 Campsicnemus comatus Hardy & Kohn, 1964 i c g
 Campsicnemus compeditus Loew, 1857 c g 
 Campsicnemus compressus Hardy & Kohn, 1964 i c g
 Campsicnemus concavus Van Duzee, 1933 
 Campsicnemus congregatus Malloch, 1932 i c g
 Campsicnemus coniculus Hardy & Kohn, 1964 c g
 Campsicnemus contortus Parent, 1937 c g
 Campsicnemus cracens Hardy & Kohn, 1964 i c g
 Campsicnemus craigi Evenhuis, 2013 
 Campsicnemus crassipes Hardy & Kohn, 1964 i c g
 Campsicnemus crinitarsis Strobl, 1906 c g
 Campsicnemus crinitibia Van Duzee, 1933 i c g 
 Campsicnemus crispatus Tenorio, 1969 c g
 Campsicnemus crossotibia Hardy & Kohn, 1964 i c g
 Campsicnemus crossotus Hardy & Kohn, 1964 i c g
 Campsicnemus curvipes (Fallén, 1823) 
 Campsicnemus curvispina Van Duzee, 1930 i c g
 Campsicnemus darvazicus Stackelberg, 1947 c g
 Campsicnemus dasycnemus Loew, 1857 c g 
 Campsicnemus deficiens Parent, 1939 i c g 
 Campsicnemus degener Wheeler, 1899 i c g
 Campsicnemus depauperatus Parent, 1939 i c g 
 Campsicnemus diamphidius Hardy & Kohn, 1964 i c g
 Campsicnemus dicondylus Hardy & Kohn, 1964 i c g
 Campsicnemus diffusus Hardy & Kohn, 1964 i c g
 Campsicnemus digitatus Tenorio, 1969 c g
 Campsicnemus disjunctus Hardy & Kohn, 1964 i c g
 Campsicnemus distinctus Hardy & Kohn, 1964 i c g
 Campsicnemus distortipes Grimshaw, 1901 i c g
 Campsicnemus divergens Van Duzee, 1933 i c g 
 Campsicnemus drymoscartes Hardy & Kohn, 1964 i c g
 Campsicnemus dytei Evenhuis, 2009 g 
 Campsicnemus ee Evenhuis, 2009 g 
 Campsicnemus elinae Evenhuis, 2013 g 
 Campsicnemus elmoi Evenhuis, 2010 
 Campsicnemus englundi Evenhuis, 2009 g 
 Campsicnemus ephydrus Hardy & Kohn, 1964 i c g
 Campsicnemus exiguus Hardy & Kohn, 1964 c g
 Campsicnemus eximius Hardy & Kohn, 1964 c g
 Campsicnemus expansus Tenorio, 1969 c g
 Campsicnemus femoratus Ringdahl, 1949 c g
 Campsicnemus ferrugineus Parent, 1934 i c g
 Campsicnemus filipes Loew, 1859 c g
 Campsicnemus fimbriatus Grimshaw, 1902 i c g
 Campsicnemus finitimus Tenorio, 1969 c g
 Campsicnemus flavipes Hardy & Kohn, 1964 i c g
 Campsicnemus flavissimus Grichanov, 2012 
 Campsicnemus flexuosus Parent, 1939 c g 
 Campsicnemus fragilis Parent, 1939 i c g 
 Campsicnemus fulvifacies Hardy & Kohn, 1964 i c g
 Campsicnemus fumipennis Parent, 1937 i c g
 Campsicnemus fusticulus Hardy & Kohn, 1964 i c g
 Campsicnemus gladiator Evenhuis, 2009 g 
 Campsicnemus gloriamontis Evenhuis, 2000 c g 
 Campsicnemus gloriosus Van Duzee, 1933 i c g 
 Campsicnemus goniochaeta Hardy & Kohn, 1964 i c g
 †Campsicnemus gracilis Meunier, 1907
 Campsicnemus grimshawi Van Duzee, 1933 i c g 
 Campsicnemus haleakalaae (Zimmerman, 1938) i c g 
 Campsicnemus halonae Evenhuis, 1996 c g 
 Campsicnemus hao Evenhuis, 2018
 Campsicnemus hardyi Tenorio, 1969 c g
 Campsicnemus hawaiiensis Hardy & Delfinado, 1974 c g
 Campsicnemus helvolus Hardy & Kohn, 1964 i c g
 Campsicnemus hihiroa Evenhuis, 2009 g 
 Campsicnemus hirtipes Loew, 1861 i c g b
 Campsicnemus hispidipes Hardy & Kohn, 1964 i c g
 Campsicnemus hiwi Evenhuis, 2015 
 Campsicnemus hoplitipodus Adachi, 1953 i c g
 Campsicnemus hygrophilus Hardy & Kohn, 1964 i c g
 Campsicnemus ii Evenhuis, 2009 g 
 Campsicnemus iii Evenhuis, 2011 
 Campsicnemus impariseta Hardy & Kohn, 1964 i c g
 Campsicnemus inaequalis Hardy & Kohn, 1964 i c g
 Campsicnemus indecorus Hardy & Kohn, 1964 i c g
 Campsicnemus inermipes Malloch, 1932 i c g
 Campsicnemus insuetus Hardy & Kohn, 1964 i c g
 Campsicnemus invaginatus Tenorio, 1969 c g
 Campsicnemus issykkulensis Selivanova, Negrobov & Grichanov, 2012
 Campsicnemus kaluanui Evenhuis, 2012 
 Campsicnemus kariae Evenhuis, 2013 
 Campsicnemus keokeo Evenhuis, 2003 c g 
 Campsicnemus kohala Evenhuis, 2013 
 Campsicnemus kokokekuku Evenhuis, 2007 c g 
 Campsicnemus kolekole Evenhuis, 2015 
 Campsicnemus konahema Evenhuis, 2016 
 Campsicnemus konstantini Grichanov, 2011 
 Campsicnemus kuku Evenhuis, 2003 c g 
 Campsicnemus kumukumu Evenhuis, 2015 
 Campsicnemus labilis Hardy & Kohn, 1964 i c g
 Campsicnemus lantsovi Grichanov, 1998 c g
 Campsicnemus latipenna Hardy & Kohn, 1964 i c g
 Campsicnemus lawakua Evenhuis, 2003 c g 
 Campsicnemus lepidochaites Hardy & Kohn, 1964 i c g
 Campsicnemus leucostoma Evenhuis, 2012 g 
 Campsicnemus limnobates Evenhuis, 2000 c g 
 Campsicnemus lineatus Negrobov & Zlobin, 1978 c g
 Campsicnemus lipothrix Evenhuis, 2003 c g 
 Campsicnemus lobatus Evenhuis, 2008 c g 
 Campsicnemus longiciliatus Parent, 1939 i c g 
 Campsicnemus longiquus Tenorio, 1969 c g
 Campsicnemus longitarsus Evenhuis, 2003 c g 
 Campsicnemus longitibia Hardy & Kohn, 1964 i c g
 Campsicnemus loripes (Haliday, 1832) c g 
 Campsicnemus loxothrix Hardy & Kohn, 1964 i c g
 Campsicnemus lumbatus Loew, 1857 c g
 Campsicnemus macula Parent, 1939 i c g 
 Campsicnemus maculatus Becker, 1918 c g
 Campsicnemus magius (Loew, 1845) c g 
 Campsicnemus makua Evenhuis, 2003 c g 
 Campsicnemus mamillatus Mik, 1869 c g
 Campsicnemus mammiculatus Parent, 1927 c g
 Campsicnemus manaka Evenhuis, 2003 c g 
 Campsicnemus marginatus Loew, 1857 c g 
 Campsicnemus marilynae Evenhuis, 2013 
 Campsicnemus maui Evenhuis, 2007 c g 
 Campsicnemus maukele Evenhuis, 2007 c g 
 Campsicnemus mediofloccus Hardy & Kohn, 1964 i c g
 Campsicnemus melanus Harmston & Knowlton, 1942 i c g
 Campsicnemus membranilobus Parent, 1939 i c g 
 Campsicnemus meridionalis Grichanov, 2012 
 Campsicnemus meyeri Evenhuis, 2013 
 Campsicnemus milleri (Harmston, 1966) i c g
 †Campsicnemus mirabilis (Grimshaw, 1902) i c g 
 Campsicnemus miritibialis Van Duzee, 1933 i c g 
 Campsicnemus miser Parent, 1939 i c g 
 Campsicnemus modicus Hardy & Kohn, 1964 i c g
 Campsicnemus montanus Harmston & Knowlton, 1942 i c g
 Campsicnemus montgomeryi (Evenhuis, 1997) c g 
 Campsicnemus moorea Evenhuis, 2013 
 Campsicnemus mucronatus Hardy & Kohn, 1964 i c g
 Campsicnemus mundulus Hardy & Kohn, 1964 c g
 Campsicnemus mylloseta Evenhuis, 2008 c g 
 Campsicnemus nambai Hardy & Kohn, 1964 i c g
 Campsicnemus neoplatystylatus Evenhuis, 2003 c g 
 Campsicnemus nigricollis Van Duzee, 1933 i c g 
 Campsicnemus nigripes Van Duzee, 1917 i c g
 Campsicnemus nigroanalis Parent, 1939 i c g 
 Campsicnemus niveisoma Evenhuis, 2012 
 Campsicnemus norops Hardy & Kohn, 1964 i c g
 Campsicnemus obscurus Parent, 1937 i c g
 Campsicnemus oedipus Wheeler, 1899 i c g
 Campsicnemus ogradyi Evenhuis, 2008 c g 
 Campsicnemus olympicola Parent, 1939 c g 
 Campsicnemus oo Evenhuis, 2009 g 
 Campsicnemus oregonensis (Harmston & Miller, 1966) i c g 
 Campsicnemus ornatus Van Duzee, 1933 i c g 
 Campsicnemus ostlinx Evenhuis, 2008 c g 
 Campsicnemus pallidoapicalis Wang, Przhiboro & Yang in Wang, Liu, Przhiboro & Yang, 2016
 Campsicnemus pallidus Parent, 1939 i c g 
 Campsicnemus paniculatus Hardy & Kohn, 1964 i c g
 Campsicnemus panini Evenhuis, 2003 c g 
 Campsicnemus paradoxus (Wahlberg, 1844) c g
 Campsicnemus paralobatus Evenhuis, 2008 c g 
 Campsicnemus parvulus Hardy & Kohn, 1964 i c g
 Campsicnemus patellifer Grimshaw, 1902 i c g
 Campsicnemus pe Evenhuis, 2003 c g 
 Campsicnemus pectinatus Evenhuis, 2013 
 Campsicnemus penicillatoides Evenhuis, 2003 c g 
 Campsicnemus penicillatus Parent i c g
 Campsicnemus perkinsi Evenhuis, 2011 
 Campsicnemus perplexus Hardy & Kohn, 1964 i c g
 Campsicnemus petalicnemus Hardy & Kohn, 1964 i c g
 Campsicnemus pherocteis Hardy & Kohn, 1964 i c g
 Campsicnemus philoctetes Wheeler, 1899 i c g
 Campsicnemus philohydratus Hardy & Kohn, 1964 i c g
 Campsicnemus picticornis (Zetterstedt, 1843) c g 
 Campsicnemus pilitarsis Negrobov & Zlobin, 1978 c g
 Campsicnemus pilosellus (Zetterstedt, 1843)
 Campsicnemus planitibia Parent, 1939 i c g 
 Campsicnemus platystylatus Hardy & Kohn, 1964 i c g
 Campsicnemus plautinus Adachi, 1953 i c g
 Campsicnemus plautus Evenhuis, 2009 g 
 Campsicnemus poho Evenhuis, 2015 
 Campsicnemus polhemusi Evenhuis, 2003 c g 
 Campsicnemus popeye Evenhuis, 2013 
 Campsicnemus prestoni Evenhuis, 2007 
 Campsicnemus profusus Hardy & Kohn, 1964 c g
 Campsicnemus puali Evenhuis, 2003 c g 
 Campsicnemus pulumi Evenhuis, 2019
 Campsicnemus pumilio (Zetterstedt, 1843) c g 
 Campsicnemus pusillus (Meigen, 1824) c g 
 Campsicnemus putillus Parent, 1937 i c g
 Campsicnemus puuoumi Evenhuis, 2013 
 Campsicnemus pycnochaeta Hardy & Kohn, 1964 i c g
 Campsicnemus quasimodicus Evenhuis, 2011 
 Campsicnemus rectus Malloch, 1932 i c g
 Campsicnemus restrictus Hardy & Kohn, 1964 i c g
 Campsicnemus rheocrenus Evenhuis, 2008 c g 
 Campsicnemus rhyphopus Hardy & Kohn, 1964 i c g
 Campsicnemus ridiculoides Evenhuis, 2016 
 Campsicnemus ridiculus Parent, 1937 i c g
 Campsicnemus sanctaehelenae Grichanov, 2012 
 Campsicnemus scambus (Fallén, 1823)
 Campsicnemus sciarus Hardy & Kohn, 1964 i c g
 Campsicnemus scolimerus Hardy & Kohn, 1964 i c g
 Campsicnemus scurra Parent, 1934 c g
 Campsicnemus setiger Hardy & Kohn, 1964 i c g
 Campsicnemus silvaticus Hardy & Kohn, 1964 i c g
 Campsicnemus simplicipes Parent, 1937 c g
 Campsicnemus simplicissimus Strobl, 1906 c g
 Campsicnemus sinuatus Van Duzee, 1933 i c g 
 Campsicnemus sinuosus Evenhuis, 2007 c g 
 Campsicnemus spectabulus Evenhuis, 2012 g 
 Campsicnemus spinicoxa Hardy & Kohn, 1964 i c g
 Campsicnemus spuh Evenhuis, 2003 c g 
 Campsicnemus tahaanus Evenhuis, 2008 c g 
 Campsicnemus taratara Evenhuis, 2009 g 
 Campsicnemus tarsiciliatus Parent, 1939 i c g 
 Campsicnemus terracolus Hardy & Kohn, 1964 c g
 Campsicnemus thersites Wheeler, 1899 i c g
 Campsicnemus tibialis Van Duzee, 1933 i c g 
 Campsicnemus tomkovichi Grichanov, 2009
 Campsicnemus truncatus Hardy & Kohn, 1964 i c g
 Campsicnemus tunoa Evenhuis, 2008 c g 
 Campsicnemus uha Evenhuis, 2003 c g 
 Campsicnemus ui Evenhuis, 2007 c g 
 Campsicnemus umbripennis Loew, 1856 c g 
 Campsicnemus uncatus Tenorio, 1969 c g
 Campsicnemus uncleremus Evenhuis, 2000 c g 
 Campsicnemus undulatus Hardy & Kohn, 1964 i c g
 Campsicnemus unipunctatus Negrobov & Zlobin, 1978 c g
 Campsicnemus unu Evenhuis, 2003 c g 
 Campsicnemus utahensis Harmston & Knowlton, 1942 i c g
 Campsicnemus uttarakhandicus Grichanov, 2016 
 Campsicnemus uu Evenhuis, 2009 g 
 Campsicnemus vafellus Parent, 1939 i c g 
 Campsicnemus vanduzeei Curran, 1933 i c g
 Campsicnemus varipes Loew, 1859 c g
 Campsicnemus versicolorus Negrobov & Zlobin, 1978 c g
 Campsicnemus viridulus Hardy & Kohn, 1964 i c g
 Campsicnemus vtorovi Negrobov & Zlobin, 1978 c g
 Campsicnemus waialealeensis Evenhuis, 2003 c g 
 Campsicnemus wheeleri Van Duzee, 1923 i c g
 Campsicnemus wilderae Runyon, 2008 c g
 Campsicnemus williamsi Van Duzee, 1933 i c g 
 Campsicnemus yangi Grichanov, 1998 c g
 Campsicnemus yunnanensis Yang & Saigusa, 2001 c g
 Campsicnemus zigzag Evenhuis, 2008 c g 
 Campsicnemus zimmermani (Evenhuis, 1997) c g 
 Campsicnemus zlobini Grichanov, 2012
 Campsicnemus zoeae Evenhuis, 2015 

Unrecognised species:
 Campsicnemus cupreus (Macquart, 1839)

Species regarded as Dolichopodidae incertae sedis:
 Campsicnemus halidayi Dyte, 1975 c g
 Campsicnemus lucidus Becker, 1924 c g

Species considered nomina nuda:
 Campsicnemus limosus Vaillant, 1978

Synonyms: 

 Campsicnemus bennetti Evenhuis, 2011: synonym of Campsicnemus labilis Hardy & Kohn, 1964
 Campsicnemus furax Parent, 1939 i c g: synonym of Campsicnemus ornatus Van Duzee, 1933
 Campsicnemus makawao Evenhuis, 2011: synonym of Campsicnemus camptoplax Hardy & Kohn, 1964
 Campsicnemus scintillatus Evenhuis, 2012: synonym of Campsicnemus ornatus Van Duzee, 1933
 Campsicnemus uniseta Hardy & Kohn, 1964 i c g: synonym of Campsicnemus albitarsus Hardy & Kohn, 1964

Species transferred to other genera:
 Campsicnemus rufinus Frey, 1925 c g: transferred to Hercostomoides

Data sources: i = ITIS, c = Catalogue of Life, g = GBIF, b = Bugguide.net

Notes

References

Campsicnemus